Narender Pal Singh (born 10 September 1973), also known as N. P. Singh, is an Indian former first-class cricketer who represented Hyderabad for 14 seasons. He later worked as a selector for Hyderabad Cricket Association.

Life and career
Born in Laksar, Singh played as a right-arm medium-fast bowler for Hyderabad. He made his first-class debut for the team at the age of 20 in the 1993–94 Ranji Trophy. He appeared in 101 first-class matches and took 319 wickets at an average less than 27. He also claimed 70 wickets in 48 List A matches at 24.68. He was one of the top four wicket-takers of the 1998–99 Ranji Trophy and part of the Hyderabad team that finished runners-up in the 1999–00 Ranji Trophy. He played his last first-class match in December 2006, finishing as one of the players with most appearances for Hyderabad (97 first-class appearances).

Singh became a selector for the Hyderabad Cricket Association (HCA) soon after his retirement. He also worked as the chairman of the senior team selection panel of HCA. He was replaced in the selection panel in 2011, after which he worked as a consultant for HCA's district and satellite academies. He was once again named chairman of the Ranji and under-25 selection panel ahead of the 2013/14 season.

References

External links 
 
 

1973 births
Living people
Indian cricketers
Hyderabad cricketers
South Zone cricketers
People from Haridwar district
Cricketers from Uttarakhand